There are various types of places where Buddha stayed. The most important kind are those monasteries which were given for his (or the Sangha's) use. Also, sometimes he was invited to stay in someone's garden or house, or he just stayed in the wilderness (a forest without owner). All these places are located in the Gangetic Plain (located in Northern India and Southern Nepal).

Monasteries
Owned by the Sangha. Originally offered to Buddha and/or the Sangha.

Savatthi:
 Jetavana. The following huts were used by Buddha: Gandhakuti, Kosambakuti
 Pubbarama. Migaramatupasada
 Rajakarama

Rajagaha: 
 Veluvana: Kalandakanivapa
 Jivakambavana
 Gijjhakata

Kosambi:
 Kukkutarama
 Ghositarama
 Pavarika-ambavana
 Badarikarama

Vesali:
 Kutagarasala
 Ambavana

Kapilavatthu:
 Nigrodharama

Saketa:
 Kalakarama

Gardens

Buddha used to stay there as a guest in someone's garden or forest

Kosambi:
 Udakavana

Nalanda:
 Pavarika's mango grove

Thullakotthika:
 Koravya's Migacira Park

Kammassadhamma:
 The fire-hut of a brahmin of the Bharadvaja-clan.

A wilderness area

These places had no owner, and generally nobody lived there.

Bodhgaya:
- Mahabodhi tree and surroundings

Benares:
- Isipatana (Sarnath)

Gaya:
- Gayasisa hill

Savatthi:
- Andhavana

Kosambi:
- Simsapavana

Campa:
- Grove of Champaka-trees

Parileyyaka: 
- Rakkhitavanasanda: Bhaddasala tree

Saketa:
- Anjanavana

Vesali:
- Beluvagama village

Mathura:
- Gundavana

And many other places...

Status not (yet) sure

Mithila:
 Makhadeva ambavana

Alavi:
 Aggalava Cetiya (shrine)

Pataligama:
 Kukkutarama

Bhaddiya:
 Jatiyavana

Kajangala:
 Veluvana
 Mukheluvana

Kimbila:
 Veluvana

Rajagaha (Other places):
 Sítavana
 Pipphaliguha (Pipphali cave)
 Udumbarikáráma
 Moranivápa: Paribbájakáráma
 Tapodarama
 Vediyagiri: Indasálaguhá
 Sattapanniguhá
 Latthivana
 Maddakucchi
 Supatitthacetiya
 Pásánakacetiya
 Sappasondikapabbhára
 the pond Sumágadhá.

Vesali:
 Pátikáráma
 Válikárám
 Udena cetiya
 Gotamaka cetiya
 Sattambaka cetiya
 Bahuputta cetiya
 Sárandada cetiya
 Kapinayha cetiya

See also

 Buddhist pilgrimage sites
 Parikrama
 Yatra

Sources and References
Sutras in the Buddhist Canon often begin with a statement of location, as in this arbitrary  example from the "Parābhava Sutta" from the Sutta Nipata:For more detailed references, try checking the Wikipedia article (if it exists) for the specific location.

Gautama Buddha
Buddhist pilgrimage sites